The 2016–17 New Jersey Devils season was the 43rd season for the National Hockey League franchise that was established on June 11, 1974, and 35th season since the franchise relocated from Colorado prior to the 1982–83 NHL season. New Jersey did not make the postseason for the fifth consecutive year. Also, this is the first time since the 1985–86 season that the Devils finished last in the conference.

Standings

Schedule and results

Pre-season

Regular season

Media
This was Sherry Ross's final season as a radio color commentator as she was let go at the end of the season. The next season, Chico Resch would return as color commentator on WFAN with Matt Loughlin.

Player statistics
Final Stats
Skaters

Goaltenders

†Denotes player spent time with another team before joining the Devils. Stats reflect time with the Devils only.
‡Denotes player was traded mid-season.  Stats reflect time with the Devils only.
Bold/italics denotes franchise record.

Awards and honors

Awards

Transactions
The Devils have been involved in the following transactions during the 2016–17 season.

Trades

Free agents acquired

Free agents lost

Claimed via waivers

Lost via waivers

Players released

Lost via retirement

Player signings

Draft picks

Below are the New Jersey Devils' selections at the 2016 NHL Entry Draft, which was held on June 24–25, 2016 at the First Niagara Center in Buffalo, New York.

Notes
 The Ottawa Senators' first-round pick went to the New Jersey Devils as the result of a trade on June 24, 2016 that sent a first-round pick (11th overall) to Ottawa in exchange for the Islanders' third-round pick in 2016 (80th overall) and this pick.
 The Ottawa Senators' third-round pick went to the New Jersey Devils as the result of a trade on June 27, 2015 that sent a second-round pick in 2015 to Ottawa in exchange for Dallas' second-round pick in 2015 and this pick (being conditional at the time of the trade). The condition – New Jersey will receive a fourth-round pick in 2015 or a third-round pick in 2016 at their choice – was converted when New Jersey did not take the 109th pick in the 2015 NHL Entry Draft.
 The New York Islanders' third-round pick went to the New Jersey Devils as the result of a trade on June 24, 2016 that sent a first-round pick in 2016 (11th overall) to Ottawa in exchange for a first-round pick in 2016 (12th overall) and this pick.
Ottawa previously acquired this pick as the result of a trade on February 29, 2016 that sent Shane Prince and a seventh-round pick in 2016 to New York in exchange for this pick (being conditional at the time of the trade). The condition – Ottawa will receive the lower of New York or Vancouver's third-round pick in 2016 – was converted on March 25, 2016 when the Canucks were eliminated from playoff contention ensuring that they would finish behind the Islanders in the overall league standings.
 The Boston Bruins' fourth-round pick went to the New Jersey Devils as the result of a trade on February 29, 2016 that sent Lee Stempniak to Boston in exchange for a second-round pick in 2017 and this pick.

References

New Jersey Devils seasons
New Jersey Devils
New Jersey Devils
New Jersey Devils
New Jersey Devils
21st century in Newark, New Jersey